James Domville (November 29, 1842 – July 30, 1921) was a Canadian businessman, militia officer and politician.

Biography
Domville was the son of a British major-general, also named James Domville. In 1858 James, Jr., went to Barbados, where his father commanded a regiment. He was educated at the Royal Military Academy and rose to the rank of lieutenant-colonel in the New Brunswick militia, commanding the 8th Princess Louise New Brunswick Hussars Cavalry Regiment.

Domville was involved in a great number of business interests. He imported tea and other goods from the British West Indies. He was invested in iron works, rolling mills, and nail factories. Domville was also a member of the board of Globe Mutual Life Assurance and of Stadacona Fire and Life Insurance, and director and president of Maritime Bank of the Dominion of Canada. He was a member of the council of the Dominion Artillery Association, a fellow of the Royal Colonial Institute, London, was president of the Kings County Board of Trade, and was chairman of the delegation from Saint John, at the Dominion Board of Trade, Ottawa, in 1871.

Domville represented King's in the House of Commons of Canada from 1872 to 1882 as a Conservative. Domville came to disagree with his party's protectionist policies – a matter which led to a physical confrontation with caucus-mate Arthur Hill Gillmor. These policies were unpopular enough with his constituents that he lost his seat in 1882, leading to his split with the Conservative Party of Sir John A. Macdonald. He would run several times unsuccessfully as an independent candidate, but when he returned to parliament from 1896 to 1900 it was as a Liberal.

Domville was also a Saint John city alderman for a time, during which he was instrumental in the establishment of the city's public library. In 1903 he was appointed to the Senate by Wilfrid Laurier, where he served until his death.

Electoral record 

By-election: On election being declared void

By-election: On Mr. Foster's acceptance of the office of Minister of Marine and Fisheries

Notes

References
 
 Peter J. Mitham, James Domville, in Canadian Dictionary of Biography online, 2004

1842 births
1921 deaths
Canadian Militia officers
8th Canadian Hussars (Princess Louise's)
8th Canadian Hussars (Princess Louise's) officers
Canadian senators from New Brunswick
Conservative Party of Canada (1867–1942) MPs
Liberal Party of Canada MPs
Liberal Party of Canada senators
Members of the House of Commons of Canada from New Brunswick
English emigrants to Canada